Hannu Tauno Tapani Toivonen (born 1967 in Helsinki) is a Finnish computer scientist and professor at the University of Helsinki.

Research and teaching 
Hannu Toivonen's research area is artificial intelligence and data science, especially data mining and computational creativity, along with their applications. He was chair of the programme committee for The International Conference on Computational Creativity in 2015 and for The International Conference on Data Mining  in 2014.

Publications 

Toivonen has published some 200 scientific articles, which have been referenced over 20,000 times in total. The most referenced articles primarily discuss the methods and theory of data mining; other referenced articles include material on context-aware mobile applications, probabilistic logic programming, paleoecology, and gene mapping. Toivonen holds 10 patents.

Career 

Toivonen completed his PhD on data mining in 1996. He has carried out research for Nokia in 1990–1993 and 1999–2003, and at the University of Helsinki 1993–1999 and 2002 onwards.

Toivonen has been a professor of computer science at the University of Helsinki since 2002. In 2005–2006, he visited the Albert Ludwig University of Freiburg, Germany. Toivonen was head of the Department of Computer Science in 2007–2009 and is vice-dean for academic affairs of the Faculty of Science for the term 2018-2021.

Honours 

 Knight, First Class, of the Order of the White Rose of Finland.
 Member of the Finnish Academy of Science and Letters.
 Member of the Finnish Academy of Technical Sciences.
 Honorary member of the computer science student association TKO-äly ry.

References

External links 

 Hannu Toivonen’s homepage
 The website of Hannu Toivonen’s research group Discovery
 Hannu Toivonen’s publications in Google Scholar
Hannu Toivonen in the research portal of the University of Helsinki

Academic staff of the University of Helsinki
Finnish computer scientists
1967 births
Living people